Issa Samba (born 29 January 1998) is a professional footballer who plays as a right-back for First League of the RS club Sloboda Novi Grad . He was born in France and represented it on junior levels, before switching to Mauritania as a senior.

Club career
Samba made his professional debut for AJ Auxerre in a 2–1 loss to Tours FC on 25 November 2016.

On 4 December 2019, he joined Italian Serie C club Gozzano.

International career
Samba was born in France to parents of Mauritanian descent. He is a youth international for France U17 and 18. He made his debut for the Mauritania national team on 26 March 2019 in a friendly against Ghana.

References

External links
 
 
 
 
 

1998 births
Living people
Sportspeople from Dreux
Mauritanian footballers
Mauritania international footballers
French footballers
France youth international footballers
French sportspeople of Mauritanian descent
Association football defenders
AJ Auxerre players
A.C. Gozzano players
Ligue 2 players
Serie C players
Mauritanian expatriate footballers
Expatriate footballers in Italy
FK Sloboda Novi Grad players
Mauritanian expatriate sportspeople in Bosnia and Herzegovina
Expatriate footballers in Bosnia and Herzegovina
Mauritanian expatriate sportspeople in Italy
Footballers from Centre-Val de Loire